Josiah Raynor (1665–1743) (also known as ‘George’ Raynor) was a pirate active in the Red Sea. Before he was briefly a pirate captain, he was a sailor on the Batchelor’s Delight on which he sailed alongside William Dampier.

Biography

In 1683 near Guinea, privateer John Cook captured a Dutch merchantman which he named Batchelor’s Delight, which itself had been the Portsmouth when captured by Dutch privateers from its English owners. With Cook were William Dampier and Edward Davis, who would later captain the ship after Cook died in 1684, as well as sailor Josiah Raynor. They sailed around South America raiding Spanish shipping and towns in concert with Charles Swan's Cygnet and others.

After scarce success and meeting defeat near Panama, the buccaneer fleet broke up in August 1685. Davis took the Batchelor’s Delight back around Cape Horn, eventually returning to the West Indies in 1688 and Philadelphia by that May.

In 1687 Raynor married Sarah Higby in Lyme CT.

Shortly afterwards the 14-gun, 80-man ship was sold to its former crew, and Raynor had now become Captain of the Batchelor’s Delight, returning to the Indian Ocean to sail against Portuguese and English shipping. He put in at Adam Baldridge’s pirate trading post near Madagascar in late 1691 after capturing a Moorish ship, along with William Cotter. After resupplying and repairing the ship, renamed Loyal Jamaica (occasionally cited as Royal Jamaica), they shared out treasure from their voyage and sailed back to the Province of South Carolina. He and his crew may have captured one last ship before ending their voyage, taking a vessel belonging to Carolina plantation owner Jonathan Amory. Raynor ran the ship aground and gave its guns to Charles Town. Absolved of piracy by 1692, he and the crew settled locally. Records show him recognized as a merchant, having been indemnified against accusations stemming from his pirate days. Raynor purchased a series of properties on Kiawah Island. His daughter married the son of former Carolina Governor James Moore, and together with some of Moore's other children, eventually moved to Cape Fear.

Raynor's name appears again a few years later as an associate of Thomas Tew and Henry Every. Raynor may have signed aboard for Thomas Tew's second voyage alongside Every in 1694, which resulted in Tew's death. Eventually making his way back to New York City around 1700, possibly with William Mayes, Raynor was suspected of piracy and had to petition a friend to intercede with Governor Benjamin Fletcher to release his treasure chest. After selling his Long Island property he settled in Connecticut.

Some sources show the Batchelor's Delight in the hands of former crewman (and associate of Cook's) James Kelley after Raynor's departure; Kelley continued his piracy in the Indian Ocean before he was captured by Moorish pirates in 1692. They burned his ship and killed many of the pirates, but Kelley and a few of his crew escaped their captors and made their way back to Madagascar. There they sailed with Robert Culliford for a time before returning to America alongside William Kidd; soon afterwards they were arrested, transported to London for trial, and executed. However, there were known to be multiple ships of the same name (Bachelor's Delight / Batchelor's Delight) operating in the same time period; some sources say that Raynor and crew abandoned the Batchelor's Delight at Madagascar (where Kelley claimed it), so it is possible that the ship Loyal Jamaica in which Raynor returned to the Carolinas was a captured prize ship (perhaps renamed) and not Davis' original ship.

See also
Pirate Round, the route from America to the coast of Africa, to Madagascar, and into the Red Sea or Indian Ocean, attributed to Tew.

Notes

Further reading
 The History and archaeology of Kiawah island, Charleston County, South Carolina by Trinkley and Adams (full version PDF)

References

British pirates
17th-century pirates
1743 deaths
Piracy in the Indian Ocean
1665 births